The Willard Parker Hospital (1885-1955) for communicable diseases was located on East 16th Street along the East River in New York City. It was founded by the City of New York in 1885. It was named after Willard Parker, a prominent physician and surgeon, who at the time was a member of the Citizens' Association which called for the state legislature to establish an independent city health department. Parker later became the Vice President of the first New York City Board of Health.

History 
At the time of its opening, there were only two other hospitals in New York City, Bellevue Hospital and New York Hospital, now called Old New York Hospital and formerly known as Broadway Hospital. It initially opened wards for the care of patients with scarlet fever and measles. Within a year, a renovation of the building allowed the inclusion of a diphtheria ward. 

In 1913, funds were raised for a new building along the same location. The hospital became a teaching resource in infectious diseases for area medical and nursing schools. 

In 1928, the hospital opened its own school of nursing, a 32-month program that awarded a diploma in nursing and qualified the graduates to sit for state licensing examinations granting Registered Nurse licensure.

See also 
 1947 New York City smallpox outbreak
 List of hospitals in New York City
 List of hospitals in Manhattan

References

External links
Website of the New York City Department of Health and Mental Hygiene

Government of New York City
Health and Mental Hygiene
Defunct hospitals in Manhattan